Valguarnera may refer to:

Fabio Valguarnera, Italian wrestler
Filippo Valguarnera (born 1977), Italian legal scholar
Mariano Valguarnera (1564 – 1634) was an Italian philologist, historian and diplomat.[1][2]
Valguarnera Caropepe, comune in Sicily, Italy
Palazzo Valguarnera-Gangi, historic house in Palermo, Sicily, Italy